Dyer Brook is a town in Aroostook County, Maine, United States. The population was 215 at the 2020 census. Dyer Brook is also host to the local school, Southern Aroostook Community School.

Geography

Demographics

2010 census

As of the census of 2010, there were 213 people, 92 households, and 71 families living in the town. The racial makeup of the town was 98.1% White, 0.5% African American, and 1.4% Native American.

There were 92 households, of which 26.1% had children under the age of 18 living with them, 70.7% were married couples living together, 3.3% had a female householder with no husband present, 3.3% had a male householder with no wife present, and 22.8% were non-families. 20.7% of all households were made up of individuals, and 12% had someone living alone who was 65 years of age or older. The average household size was 2.32 and the average family size was 2.65.

The median age in the town was 48.1 years. 19.2% of residents were under the age of 18; 3.7% were between the ages of 18 and 24; 23% were from 25 to 44; 38% were from 45 to 64; and 16% were 65 years of age or older. The gender makeup of the town was 47.4% male and 52.6% female.

2000 census

As of the census of 2000, there were 199 people, 79 households, and 62 families living in the town.  The population density was 5.2 people per square mile (2.0/km2).  There were 116 housing units at an average density of 3.0 per square mile (1.2/km2).  The racial makeup of the town was 97.49% White, 2.01% Native American and 0.50% Asian.

There were 79 households, out of which 26.6% had children under the age of 18 living with them, 70.9% were married couples living together, 6.3% had a female householder with no husband present, and 21.5% were non-families. 10.1% of all households were made up of individuals, and 2.5% had someone living alone who was 65 years of age or older.  The average household size was 2.52 and the average family size was 2.71.

In the town, the population was spread out, with 19.1% under the age of 18, 4.5% from 18 to 24, 23.1% from 25 to 44, 35.7% from 45 to 64, and 17.6% who were 65 years of age or older.  The median age was 46 years. For every 100 females, there were 95.1 males.  For every 100 females age 18 and over, there were 106.4 males.

The median income for a household in the town was $46,429, and the median income for a family was $46,429. Males had a median income of $40,000 versus $20,625 for females. The per capita income for the town was $18,658.  About 2.9% of families and 5.5% of the population were below the poverty line, including 15.4% of those under the age of eighteen and none of those 65 or over.

Notable people

 Harold Drew, American football player and coach

References

Towns in Aroostook County, Maine
Towns in Maine